Richard A. Bird (born June 16, 1940), is a politician in the American state of Florida. He served in the Florida House of Representatives from 1966 to 1968, representing the 85th district.

References

1940 births
Living people
Members of the Florida House of Representatives
Michigan State University alumni
University of Florida alumni